Anthony Mathenge Gitau (born 23 October 1978) is a Kenyan footballer. He played in 24 matches for the Kenya national football team from 2002 to 2009. He was also named in Kenya's squad for the 2004 African Cup of Nations tournament.

References

1978 births
Living people
Kenyan footballers
Kenya international footballers
2004 African Cup of Nations players
Place of birth missing (living people)
Association football midfielders